Zhejiang Gongshang University (abbreviated as ZJGSU or ZJSU) is a public higher educational institution that focuses on the fields of social science.

The university is administrated by Zhejiang Province. "Zhejiang" is the province where the university is and "Gongshang" is the Chinese pronunciation of two words meaning "Industry and Business".

History 

The institution was established in 1911 as Hangzhou Vocational Business School (the earliest Chinese Business School). In 1980, the school became a public university approved by the National Ministry of Education, Hangzhou Institute of Commerce. In 2004, it was renamed Zhejiang Gongshang University.

International focus
In the past years, ZJSU has been paying great attention to international exchanges and cooperation, and making an effort to promote education internationalization. The university has partner relationships with more than 90 universities and scientific research institutions from more than 50 countries (including the United States, Britain, Germany, France, Belgium, Canada, New Zealand, Australia, Turkey, Japan, and South Korea, etc.). Moreover, ZJSU started cooperation programs with over 60 foreign universities and research institutions (such as Columbia University, University of California at Berkeley, University of Manchester, Waseda University, University of Canterbury, and Chulalongkorn University) in the areas of faculty and students exchange, mutual accreditation of credits, scientific research cooperation.

MPM, in cooperation with the University of Quebec, has trained over 600 postgraduates. Alliance Française de Hangzhou has developed into the largest French language training and cultural exchange center in Zhejiang Province. ZJSU co-established Confucius Institute with Howest University, Belgium. The number of students in Confucius Institute has reached over 600. ZJSU also co-established research centers with well-known foreign universities and research institutions, such as Sensory Science Laboratory with American Monell Chemical Sense Center.

ZJSU launched "Blue Sky" project aimed at enhancing faculty internationalization. It sends 50 promising teachers annually to key foreign universities for study and research; dozens of academic leaders and young administrators attend key universities overseas for training as well. The university encourages scholars to attend international academic meetings and activities. ZJSU actively conducts student exchange programs with key universities overseas and has sent thousands of students in recent years to foreign universities for long-term and short-term exchange and visiting programs. From 2014, ZJSU has set up a special fund of 3 million RMB yuan annually, for sponsoring excellent students to study abroad for long or short terms.

With the development of internationalization and the overall improvement, the university has hosted and sponsored more than 20 large-scale international activities and important academic conferences, including the 2010 International Association of University Presidents (IAUP) Conference of North East Asia, the 20th International Association of Feminist Economics, the Academic Conference of East Asian Culture co-organized with University of Columbia and the 2012 Bangkok Asia Food Science Forum co-hosted with Chulalongkorn University, Thailand.

May 2011 was the 100th anniversary of ZJSU; nearly 100 friend universities in the US, UK, Canada and other countries sent congratulatory messages. In 2012, Complete Works of Dickens by the university publishing house was used as the state gift at the Book Fair of London. In 2013 ZJSU held International Education Week, which was hosted by ZJSU and co-organized by more than 20 partner universities from the USA, UK, Belgium, Australia, New Zealand, Japan, South Korea, and Republic of Northern Cyprus.

The university has employed over 300 teachers from the United States, Britain, Germany, Australia, Japan, South Korea, etc, among which three foreign experts were awarded the Zhejiang provincial government's West Lake Friendship Award. ZJSU invited foreign experts and scholars to give over 500 short-term courses or lectures and had over 2000 foreign guests and visitors, such as Nobel Prize winner Professor Luc Montagnier, French academician of Collège de France Pierre Devolve.

ZJSU attaches great importance to international education. Since 2009, ZJSU established scholarships for international students. More than 100 students got this scholarship and, at the same time, about 100 international students got a Zhejiang Provincial Government Scholarship. To expand the number of international students and increase degree students, ZJSU has established 27 foreign-language-taught degree programs specially designed for international students. Now, the number of international students doubles every year. More than 300 foreign students are pursuing bachelor, master and doctoral degrees, and hundreds of international students annually study Chinese, Chinese culture and Chinese business in the university.

School campus 

 Xiasha Campus (the new campus since 2004)
 Jiaogong Lu Campus (the old campus)

Colleges and departments
 Zhang Naiqi Honors College
 Hangzhou College of Commerce
 College of Business Administration
 College of Economics
 College of Finance
 College of Statistics & Maths
 College of Accounting
 College of Tourism
 College of Law
 College of Food Science, Biotechnology & Environmental Engineering
 College of Information & Electronic Engineering
 College of Computer Science & Information Engineering
 College of Humanity and Mass Communication
 College of Public Management
 College of Foreign Languages
 College of Japanese Language & Culture
 College of Art Design

Notable people
Notable alumni have included:
Peng Lei - co-founder of Alibaba Group and CEO of Ant Financial

References

External links
 Official website
 Campus three-dimensional map

 
Universities and colleges in Hangzhou
Educational institutions established in 1911
1911 establishments in China